The Synod of Worms of May 868 was a council of the church in East Francia, convoked by King Louis the German at the request of Pope Nicholas I. It condemned the Synod of Constantinople of 867 as heretical and condemned Great Moravia for rebelling against Louis.

The synod was attended by two archbishops, twenty bishops, a chorbishop and seven abbots. This was a high level of attendance for the ninth century in East Francia. It was under the presidency of Archbishop Liutbert of Mainz. Held in the aftermath of the Photian Schism, which had divided the Greek East and Latin West, it sought to uphold Western teaching and Papal primacy. It issued a Response against the Heresy of the Greeks (Latin Responsio  contra Grecorum heresim) to refute the council of 867. In response to years of unrest in Moravia and the marches of Pannonia and Carantania, the synod authorized the confiscation of the rebels' private property and their excommunication. Rebellious clergy were to be deposed from their offices. It is probable that the synod had in mind the Byzantine missionaries Constantine and Methodius, who had been working in Moravia, but by 868 they had the support of Pope Hadrian II in Rome.

The synod issued 44 canons. Seven of them found their way into Gratian's Decretum, a higher number than for any other Frankish synod save the Synod of Tribur. The bishops at Worms were influenced by the councils of Toledo. On matters of episcopal authority, the canons cite the Collectio Hispana and not the False Decretals, either because the latter were unknown in East Francia or else were not considered authoritative there. Copies of the canons were regularly extended, however, so that some have as many as 80 canons (36 spurious). There are almost 100 surviving manuscript sources for the canons of Worms. Besides Gratian, they are also quoted in Regino of Prüm, Burchard of Worms, Bonizo of Sutri and Ivo of Chartres.


Signatories
The signatories of the acts of the synod were:

Liutbert of Mainz
Adalwin of Salzburg
Rimbert of Hamburg
Altfrid of Hildesheim
Gunzo of Worms
Salomon of Constance
Anno of Freising
Lantfrid of Säben
Ermanrich of Passau 
Otgar of Eichstätt
Witgar of Augsburg
Ratold of Strasbourg
Gebhard of Speyer
Arn of Würzburg
Liutbert of Münster
Theoderic of Minden
Hildegrim of Halberstadt
Liuthard of Paderborn
Gerolf of Verden
Egibert of Osnabrück
Bernard, chorepiscopus
Heito of Reichenau, abbot and priest
Adalgar of Corvey, abbot and priest
Theotroch of Lorsch, abbot and priest
Theoto of Fulda, abbot and priest
Brunward of Hersfeld, abbot
Egilbert (of Utrecht?), abbot

References

Further reading
Hartmann, Wilfried. Das Konzil von Worms 868: Überlieferung und Bedeutung. Vandenhoeck & Ruprecht, 1977.

868
9th-century church councils
9th century in East Francia
Byzantine Empire–Holy Roman Empire relations
Catholicism and Eastern Orthodoxy
Great Moravia